Bengalia is a genus of blow flies in the family Calliphoridae with one authority considering the genus to belong to a separate family Bengaliidae. These bristly and, unlike the greens and blues of most calliphorids, dull coloured flies, are especially noted for their relationship to ants. Little is known of their biology and life-cycle, although adults of many species are kleptoparasitic on ants and will snatch food and pupae being carried by ants or feed on winged termites.
The apt name “Highwayman Fly” was given by an early observer of their way of robbing ants.
Very little is known about their breeding habits. The genus is found in the Afrotropical and oriental region with one species from Australia possibly a recent introduction.

Description
Most of the species have a yellow or brown ground-colour, an antero-posteriorly compressed head, stout mouthparts, a projecting clypeus below the lower facial margin, and have a silent flight.

Behaviour
Bengalia flies are best known for their remarkable highwayman-like habit of robbing ant pupae from ants moving on ant roads.
With respect to Bengalia depressa this habit is described as follows: “[The flies were] settling on blades of grass, stones, and other raised objects near the ant column. ... When any ant made a little circuit away from the main body, a fly would generally pursue it at a distance of about half an inch, but back away as soon as the ant turned towards it. ... Eventually Lamborn saw a fly stalk a minor ant carrying a pupa in its jaws. Suddenly the fly rushed forward and apparently pierced the pupa bringing the ant up with a sharp jerk. The two insects then had a tug of war with very little advantage to either side, until the ant apparently became annoyed and letting go of the pupa rushed at the fly, which escaped with the booty which it proceeded to suck. Then he saw a fly swoop down on the ant column and rise at once with a pupa and attendant ant, both of which it dropped after carrying them for about a foot. The ant, however, still held on and started to run off with its charge. The fly caught it again and this time rose three feet in the air and then dropped ant and pupa again. This time the ant left the pupa which the fly immediately seized and proceeded to suck.”

Species

Bengalia africana Malloch, 1927
Bengalia africanoides Rognes
Bengalia akamanga (Lehrer)
Bengalia aliena Malloch, 1927
Bengalia asymmetria Kurahashi & Tumrasvin, 1979
Bengalia bantuphalla (Lehrer)
Bengalia bezzii Senior-White, 1923
Bengalia calilungae Rueda, 1985
Bengalia chekiangensis Fan
Bengalia chiangmaiensis Kurahashi & Tumrasvin, 1979
Bengalia chromatella Séguy, 1946
Bengalia concava Malloch, 1927
Bengalia cuthbertsoni Zumpt, 1956 
Bengalia depressa Walker, 1858
Bengalia emarginata Malloch
Bengalia emarginatoides Rognes
Bengalia emdeniella (Lehrer)
Bengalia escheri Bezzi, 1913
Bengalia fani Feng & Wei
Bengalia favillacea (Walker)
Bengalia fernandiella Lehrer
Bengalia floccosa Wulp
Bengalia fuscipennis Bezzi, 1913
Bengalia gaillardi Sourcouf & Guyon, 1912 - Synonyms:B. spurca Brauer & Bergenstamm, 1891, B. spurca Villeneuve, 1914
Bengalia gigas Macquart
Bengalia hastativentris Senior-White, 1923
Bengalia hobbyi Senior-White, 1940
Bengalia inermis Malloch, 1927
Bengalia jejuna Fabricius
Bengalia kanoi Kurahashi & Magpayo, 2000
Bengalia kuyanianus Matsumura
Bengalia labiata Robineau-Desvoidy, 1830
Bengalia lampunia Lehrer
Bengalia lateralis Macquart
Bengalia latro Meijere
Bengalia lyneborgi James, 1966
Bengalia martinleakei Senior-White, 1930
Bengalia minor Malloch, 1927
Bengalia nirvanella Lehrer
Bengalia pallidicoxa Senior-White, 1946
Bengalia peuhi Villeneuve, 1914
Bengalia pseudovaricolor Kurahashi & Tumrasvin, 1979
Bengalia pygomalaya Lehrer
Bengalia racovitzai (Lehrer)
Bengalia recurva Malloch, 1927
Bengalia robertsi Kurahashi, 1987
Bengalia roubaudi Rickenbach, Hamon & Mochet, 1960
Bengalia semerunia Lehrer
Bengalia seniorwhitei (Lehrer)
Bengalia siamensis Senior-White, 1924
Bengalia smarti (Lehrer)
Bengalia spinifemorata Villeneuve, 1913
Bengalia subnitida James, 1964
Bengalia surcoufi Senior-White, 1923
Bengalia taiwanensis Fan, 1965
Bengalia taksina (Lehrer)
Bengalia tibiaria Villeneuve, 1926
Bengalia torosa Wiedemann
Bengalia unicolor Senior-White, 1946
Bengalia varicolor Fabricius, 1805
Bengalia wangariae (Lehrer)
Bengalia weii Rognes
Bengalia wyatti (Lehrer)
Bengalia xanthopyga Senior-White, 1924
Bengalia zhangi (Lehrer & Wei)

Taxonomic dispute
The genus was reclassified into 11 new genera in 4 subfamilies by Andy Lehrer in 2005, within a newly designated family, Bengaliidae. The family designation was disputed by Rognes (2006) who noted that it was equivalent to the already established tribe Bengaliini (now the subfamily Bengaliinae), and that treating it as a family would render the Calliphoridae paraphyletic. Further, Rognes considered all the new genera created as junior synonyms of Bengalia. Lehrer's work proposed adding 49 species to the already described 41 species and 18 of these new species were treated as invalid by Rognes. At present, major sources of Dipteran taxonomy do not recognize Lehrer's 10 new genera as valid, nor the 18 new species treated as invalid by Rognes (e.g.). Additional names (of these and related flies) published by Lehrer have since been synonymized, with 120 new synonymies established in a single review in 2020.

This dispute reflects that at present, there is no consensus as to the best way to subdivide the Calliphoridae, which many authorities acknowledge is not a natural group (in this case, polyphyletic); the BioSystematic Database of World Diptera, for example, states "The Calliphoridae are marked as a polyphyletic group of convenience as at the present we are unwilling to reduce the Oestridae to a subordinated group within a monophyletic Calliphoridae nor to elevate a number of other groups (Polleniidae, Helicoboscidae, and Bengaliidae) so as to properly delimit both Calliphoridae and Oestridae." Similarly, the dispute at the generic level is that some of Lehrer's genera are paraphyletic, and, additionally, that they are based largely or exclusively upon features of the male genitalia, and it is therefore impossible to identify most female specimens to subfamily, let alone genus (the rejection of Lehrer's subdivisions therefore being both taxonomic and a matter of practicality). The dispute at the species level centers on the fact that Lehrer did not include or examine 24 of the 41 known species in his revision, so of the 31 species he validly described that were not immediately synonymized, many could still potentially be synonyms of these 24 excluded species.

References

Calliphoridae
Oestroidea genera
Taxa named by Jean-Baptiste Robineau-Desvoidy